The 2015 Tokyo Marathon was the ninth edition of the annual marathon race in Tokyo, Japan and was held on Sunday, 22 February. An IAAF Gold Label Road Race, it was the first World Marathon Majors event to be held that year and represented the third occasion that the Tokyo race was part of the elite-level marathon series.

The elite race winners were both from Ethiopia – the first such time that athletes from the same nation won the men's and women's division. Endeshaw Negesse was just over twenty seconds off the course record with 2:06:00 hours while Berhane Dibaba took the women's title in 2:23:15. It was the first major marathon win for both athletes, although Berhane Dibaba had been runner-up in Tokyo the previous year. The reigning Olympic and world champion Stephen Kiprotich was runner-up in the men's race and Dickson Chumba was third, failing to defend his title. The women's podium was rounded out by Helah Kiprop (2014 winner of the Seoul International Marathon) and reigning Olympic champion Tiki Gelana. The 2014 women's champion, Tirfi Tsegaye did not return to defend her title. The fastest home athletes both finished in seventh position overall: Masato Imai in the men's and Madoka Ogi in the women's division.

As in the previous year, the wheelchair race was principally a national affair. Wakako Tsuchida defended her title while Kota Hokinoue—winner at the 2014 Berlin Marathon—won the men's wheelchair race for the first time.

Results

Elite men

Other notable performers
Ryo Yamamoto: 17th, 2:12:46
Yuki Sato: 20th, 2:14:15
Arata Fujiwara: 37th, 2:19:40

Elite women

Men's wheelchair

Women's wheelchair

References

Race results
Results 2015 Tokyo Marathon Man . Tokyo Marathon. Retrieved on 2015-02-23.
Results 2015 Tokyo Marathon Woman . Tokyo Marathon. Retrieved on 2015-02-23.
Results マラソン車いす男子／Marathon:Wheelchair(Men) . Tokyo Marathon. Retrieved on 2015-02-23.
Results マラソン車いす女子／Marathon:Wheelchair(Women) . Tokyo Marathon. Retrieved on 2015-02-23.

External links

Official website
Participation data 

Tokyo Marathon
Tokyo
2015 in Tokyo
Tokyo Marathon
February 2015 sports events in Japan